Anatrachyntis risbeci is a moth in the family Cosmopterigidae. It was described by Jean Ghesquière in 1940 and is known from Senegal.

References

Moths described in 1940
Anatrachyntis
Insects of West Africa
Moths of Africa